Zhou Xun (born 18 October 1974) is a Chinese actress and singer. She is regarded as one of the Four Dan Actresses of China. She gained international fame for her roles in Suzhou River (2000) and Balzac and the Little Chinese Seamstress (2002). In 2009, she became the first Chinese actor to win the "Grand Slam", after winning the three biggest film awards, the Golden Horse Awards, the Hong Kong Film Awards and the Golden Rooster Awards.

Zhou has won Best Actress honors from Asian Film Awards, Asian Television Awards, Beijing College Student Film Festival, China Film Director's Guild Awards, China TV Golden Eagle Award, Chinese Film Media Awards, Golden Bauhinia Awards, Golden Horse Film Festival and Awards, Golden Rooster Awards, Hong Kong Film Awards, Hong Kong Film Critics Society Awards, Hundred Flowers Awards, Huading Awards, Shanghai Television Festival and Shanghai Film Critics Awards; as well as the French award-giving body Festival du Film de Paris.

Early life
Zhou was born to a middle-class family in Quzhou, Zhejiang. Her father, Zhou Tianning, was a local film projectionist, and her mother, Chen Yiqin, was a salesperson at a department store. She had her schooling in Quzhou No.1 Middle School. After she graduated, Zhou enrolled at the Zhejiang Arts Institute to further her interest in dramatic arts, against the wishes of her parents, who wanted her to graduate from a university. She was handpicked for a role in the film Strange Tales Amongst Old and Desolate Tombs during her teenage years in school.

Acting career

1995–2004: Beginnings and breakthrough
Zhou debuted in the comedy movie The Pampered Wife (1995). She next starred in Chen Kaige's films, Temptress Moon (1996) and The Emperor and the Assassin (1999). But it was not until in 2000 that Zhou received recognition in China. With her role as young Princess Taiping in historical drama Palace of Desire, Zhou received the Audience's Choice for Actress and Best Supporting Actress awards at the 18th China TV Golden Eagle Award.

Zhou achieved breakthrough on the big screen with Lou Ye's Suzhou River (2000), which won her the Best Actress award at the 15th Festival du Film de Paris. That year, she was named one of the Four Dan Actresses alongside Zhang Ziyi, Zhao Wei and Xu Jinglei. She further achieved international recognition when she starred in the Franco-Chinese romance drama film Balzac and the Little Chinese Seamstress (2002).

A string of successful projects followed. In her first Hong Kong film Hollywood Hong Kong directed by Fruit Chan, Zhou impressed critics with her performance. Hollywood magazine Variety praise Zhou saying "Zhou is superb, moving with ease between her various personalities and always convincing in each".
Among Zhou's earlier notable works also include television series April Rhapsody (2000), Love Story in Shanghai (2001) and The Legend of the Condor Heroes (2003);

2005–2011: Critical acclaim
She next starred in Feng Xiaogang's wuxia film The Banquet (2006), inspired from William Shakespeare's Hamlet. Zhou plays the girlfriend of the crown prince, equivalent to Ophelia. In 2007, she starred in Susie Au's film Ming Ming, which was highly praised at the 11th Pusan International Film Festival. Zhou played dual roles – twins with absolutely different characteristics and personalities.

She then starred in Cao Baoping's romantic thriller The Equation of Love and Death (2008) as a taxicab driver on the lookout for her missing boyfriend. Critics again praised Zhou, crediting the film's success to Zhou's performance as Li Mi. Zhou went on to receive Best Actress awards at the Asian Film Awards, Shanghai Film Critics Awards, Golden Rooster Film Festival, and Chinese Film Media Awards. The same year she appeared in Gordon Chan's horror-adventure film Painted Skin, a remake of a classic supernatural thriller of the same title. Next came spy thriller The Message (2009), about Japanese invaders in China who try to ferret out a spy among their Chinese collaborators.

In 2009, Zhou was named the Star of the Year at CineAsia exhibition and distribution convention in Hong Kong. Asia-Pacific Producers Network (APN) also honored her as the Asian Star of the Year for her exemplary box office achievements. In an interview with CNN, Zhou was named Asia's 25 greatest actors of all time.

She filmed the wuxia film Flying Swords of Dragon Gate (2011) directed by Tsui Hark.

2012–present: Directorial and Hollywood debut, television comeback

In 2011, Zhou made her directorial debut with the short film Five Demon Traps, which stars Tony Leung Chiu-wai as a demon killer.

In 2012, Zhou made her Hollywood debut in the science fiction film Cloud Atlas, playing multiple roles in the film. The film grossed over the 700 million yuan ($109.8 million) landmark, becoming the highest-grossing Chinese-language movie of all time then.

In 2014, Zhou returned to television after 10 years in Red Sorghum, based on Nobel prize laureate Mo Yan's 1986/1987 novel of the same name. Zhou's performance in the series was highly praised by the author himself for her immaculate grasp of the character's inner turmoil. Zhou won the Best Actress Award at the Asian Television Award.

In 2018 she starred in the romance film Last Letter directed by Shunji Iwai, and was nominated for the Best Actress award at the Golden Horse Awards.

In 2019, Zhou starred in the crime thriller film Remain Silent.

In 2021, Zhou starred in fantasy film The Yinyang Master.

Zhou is set to star in the wuxia film The Weary Poet, and family drama film The Eleventh Chapter.

Social activities

Zhou Xun was named the first United Nations Development Programme (UNDP) Goodwill Ambassador for China in 2008 with a special focus of promoting environmental sustainability. Zhou jointly runs a campaign 'Our Part', which promotes 'tips for green living'.

On 22 April 2010, she became the Laureate of United Nations Environment Programme (UNEP)'s Champions of the Earth (Inspiration & Action). She was the first entertainer in the world to receive this honour.

Fashion
In 2006, Zhou had become a global spokesperson for Miu Miu. In 2008, she selected as a brand ambassador of Lancel for Greater China region. Since 2011, Zhou had been an ambassador for Chanel. Chanel chief designer Karl Lagerfeld noted Zhou Xun for her strong fashion sense, describing the actress as "a synthesis of young Coco Chanel and Ballet Troupe Zizi Jeanmaire."

Zhou has been on the cover of many top fashion magazines including Vogue China and Vogue Taiwan, Chinese and Hong Kong Harper's Bazaar, Chinese and Hong Kong Elle, Chinese and Taiwanese Marie Claire, Chinese and Hong Kong Cosmopolitan, Chinese L'Officiel, Chinese Madame Figaro, Chinese Numéro, Chinese T, Chinese GQ, Chinese Esquire, Chinese Elle Men, Chinese Harper's Bazaar Men.

Personal life

Marriage 
Zhou Xun married American actor Archie Kao on 16 July 2014 on stage after a charity event in Hangzhou, Zhejiang, China. On 23 December 2020, Zhou announced on her Sina Weibo account that they have divorced.

Zhou received Hong Kong citizenship under the "Quality Migrant Admission Scheme" in 2009.

Anecdote 
Zhou had underwater phobia due to nearly drowning as a child. However, most dramas that she participated have underwater scenes. For example, during the filming of the film "Painted Skin: The Resurrection",  she was required to soak in water for half a month.

In an interview with several magazines in 2012, Zhou said that because she was not good at expressing herself and rarely used the Internet, receiving too much information was also a burden, so she did not apply for accounts on popular social networking sites, such as Weibo.

Filmography

Film

Television series

Short films

Voiced films

As producer

As director

Discography

Albums

Singles

Awards and nominations

Forbes China Celebrity 100

References

External links

 
Zhou Xun on Sina Weibo 
Zhou Xun on Sina.com 

 

1974 births
Actresses from Zhejiang
Contraltos
Chinese contraltos
Living people
People from Quzhou
20th-century Chinese actresses
21st-century Chinese actresses
Singers from Zhejiang
Chinese environmentalists
People's Republic of China Tibetan Buddhists
Chinese women environmentalists
Chinese film actresses
Chinese television actresses
21st-century Chinese women singers
Best Actress Asian Film Award winners
Chinese emigrants to Hong Kong